The 1996 NCAA Men's Division I Basketball Championship Game was the finals of the 1996 NCAA Men's Division I Basketball Tournament and it determined the national champion for the 1995-96 NCAA Division I men's basketball season  The 1996 National Title Game was played on April 1, 1996, at Continental Airlines Arena in East Rutherford, New Jersey. The 1996 National Title Game was played between the 1996 Midwest Regional Champions, #1-seeded Kentucky and the 1996 West Regional Champions, #4-seeded Syracuse.

This was the first time the national championship game was held in the Greater New York Area since 1950. This was also the last men's national championship game to be held in a basketball/hockey-specific facility. Every Men's National Championship Game since then has been held in a domed stadium (usually built for football) because of NCAA venue capacity requirements. Therefore, this was the last time the national championship game was held in the Greater New York Area, or anywhere else in the Northeastern United States.

Kentucky star Antoine Walker faced off against former high school teammate, Donovan McNabb, in the national championship against Syracuse University. McNabb would later gain fame as a quarterback with the Philadelphia Eagles.

Participating teams

Syracuse

West
Syracuse (4) 88, Montana State (13) 55
Syracuse 69, Drexel (12) 58
Syracuse 83, Georgia (8) 81 (OT)
Syracuse 60, Kansas (2) 57
Final Four
Syracuse 77, Mississippi State (5) 69

Kentucky

Midwest
Kentucky (1) 110, San Jose State (16) 72
Kentucky 84, Virginia Tech (9) 60
Kentucky 101, Utah (4) 70
Kentucky 83, Wake Forest (2) 63
Final Four
Kentucky 81, Massachusetts (1) 74

Starting lineups

Game summary

References

NCAA Division I Men's Basketball Championship Game
NCAA Division I Men's Basketball Championship Games
Kentucky Wildcats men's basketball
Syracuse Orange men's basketball
College basketball tournaments in New Jersey
Sports competitions in East Rutherford, New Jersey
NCAA Division I Men's Basketball Championship Game
NCAA Division I Men's Basketball Championship Game
20th century in East Rutherford, New Jersey